Karnal ( is a city located in the state of Haryana, India and is the administrative headquarters of Karnal District. It was used by East India Company army as a refuge during the Indian Rebellion of 1857 in Delhi. The Battle of Karnal between Nader Shah of Persia and the Mughal Empire took place in this city in 1739.

Etymology
The city associates itself with the mythological character Karna from the Indian epic Mahabharata.

History

Ancient 
At the end of 6th century A.D., the area was under the rule of the Vardhanas of Thanesar. The 7th century was a period of religious eclecticism, as Buddhism was declining and Hinduism was resurging in the Indo-Gangetic plains. The region was under Kanauji rule under the Pala Emperors of Bengal from 770 to 810 AD. The authority of Mihira Bhoja, the Pratihara ruler of Kanauj from 836 to 885 AD, penetrated as far as Pehowa, including Karnal.

Medieval 
The Tomaras, a dynasty descending from Raja Jaala, established themselves as rulers of this region in the middle of the 9th century. About the beginning of the 10th century, as the Pratyahara power began to decline, the Tomaras assumed independence. One of the Tomara rulers, Amanpal Tomar, found the city of Delhi and made it his capital, with the area of Karnal and modern-day Haryana being under his realm. The Tomaras came into conflict with the Chauhan's of Shakambhari, but continued to rule the Haryana country until the middle of 12th century when they were overthrown by the Chaha mana Vighnaraja IV. The country between the Satluj and the Yamuna including Karnal experienced relative peace for a century and a half except the plundering invasions and eventual conquests of Mahmud of Ghazi. The region then came under Ghurid rule after the Second Battle of Tarani when Muhammad Ghori captured the area. It remained under the Delhi Sultanate until 1526.

In 1526 at the First Battle of Panipat, Mughal emperor Babur defeated the Sultan of Delhi, Ibrahim Lodi, and captured India along with Delhi and Panipat. He then established the Mughal Empire.

Karnal is listed in the Mughal Ain-i-Akbari as a pargana under Delhi sarkar, producing a revenue of 5,678,242 dams for the imperial treasury and supplying a force of 800 infantry and 50 cavalry.

In A.D. 1739, Nader Shah of Persia invaded the Mughal empire and Karnal was the scene of the famed Battle of Karnal, in which Nader Shah decisively defeated the Mughal Emperor, Muhammad Shah. Muhammad Shah along with an enormous army occupied a strongly fortified camp at Karnal, but he yielded to the invader as his supplies were cut off from the open country by Shah and was starved into submission. The tactical defeat drastically weakened the Mughal Empire, while the Persian Empire prospered and subsequently hastened the establishment of the British Empire in India. The region then came under Afghan rule.

Sikhs appeared on the scene in the 18th century. The importance of Karnal grew in the time of Raja Gajpat Singh of Jind State who after its capture in A.D. 1763 built the boundary wall and a fort and under whose rule the town increased considerably in size. On 14 January 1764, Sikh Chiefs defeated and killed Zain Khan Sirhindi, the Durrani Governor, and took possession of the whole of Sirhind province as far south as Panipat including Karnal.

Modern 
During the Indian independence movement, a district political conference was organized at Karnal with Lala Lajpat Rai as its chairman.

Climate

Demographics
The population of the city as of 2011, is 357,334

{| class="wikitable sortable"
|+ Religion in Karnal City
|-
! Religion
! Population(1911)
! Percentage(1911)
! Population(1941)
! Percentage(1941)
|-
| Hinduism 
| 12,772
|
| 20,462
|
|-
| Islam  
| 8,667
|
| 15,844
|
|-
| Sikhism 
| 130
|
| 647
|
|-
| Christianity 
| 210
|
| 125
|
|-
| Others 
| 182
|
| 366
|
|-
| Total Population
| 21,961
|
| 37,444
|
|}

Politics 
The city is part of the Karnal Assembly constituency and Manohar Lal Khattar is the MLA from Karnal constituency.

Sanjay Bhatia is the current elected MP from the Karnal Lok Sabha constituency.

Facilities
Karnal was ranked 24th (1st in Haryana) among 4000+ cities in the list of the cleanest cities of India under the government survey named Swachh Survekshan 2019.

Karnal was selected as one of the hundred Indian cities to be developed as a smart city'' under the Union government's plan Smart Cities Mission.

Education 
 National Dairy Research Institute, Karnal.
 St. Theresa's Convent Sr. Sec. School.
 Kalpana Chawla Government Medical College.
 Pratap Public School.
 Maharana Pratap Horticultural University.
 Pandit Deen Dayal Upadhayaya University of Health Sciences.

Notable people

Anish Bhanwala, Indian shooter. He was brought up in Karnal, Haryana and competes in the 25 meter rapid fire pistol, 25 meter pistol, and 25 meter standard pistol events.
 Kalpana Chawla, first Indo-American woman astronaut. In 2003, Chawla was one of the seven crew members that died in the Space Shuttle Columbia disaster 
 Vikramjeet Virk A Bollywood Actor. He Was Born in 1984 Village Tharwa Majra Of Karnal. He’s Well Renowned Actor Working in Hindi, Punjabi, Telugu Films.
 Mool Chand Jain, a leader of the Indian Independence movement.
 General Arthur Power Palmer, Commander-in-Chief of India was born in 1840
 Navdeep Saini, Indian cricketer

Notes

References

External links

 
Cities and towns in Karnal district
Smart cities in India